Who's Boss? is a 1914 silent comedy film featuring Oliver Hardy.

Plot

Cast
 Harry Lorraine as Sam Briggs
 Mae Hotely as Sue Briggs
 Billy Bowers as Clancey
 Ben Walker as Pat Murphy
 Oliver Hardy (as Babe Hardy)

See also
 List of American films of 1914
 Oliver Hardy filmography

External links

1914 films
1914 short films
1914 comedy films
Silent American comedy films
American silent short films
American black-and-white films
Films directed by Arthur Hotaling
American comedy short films
1910s American films